The 2016 New England Revolution season was the club's 21st season of existence and their 21st season in Major League Soccer, the top-flight of American soccer.

Squad

Current roster 

As of May 14, 2016. Source: New England Revolution Roster

Technical staff

Player movement

In 

Per Major League Soccer and club policies terms of the deals do not get disclosed.

Out

Loans

Loans In

Loans Out

Matches and results

Desert Diamond Cup

MLS regular season

U.S. Open Cup

Tables

Eastern Conference

Overall table

See also 

 2016 Major League Soccer season
 2016 in American soccer

References 

New England Revolution seasons
New England Revolution
New England Revolution
New England Revolution
Sports competitions in Foxborough, Massachusetts